ViuTV is a Cantonese language general entertainment television channel in Hong Kong, China operated by HK Television Entertainment (HKTVE), whose parent company PCCW also operates the IPTV platform Now TV and the media streaming service Viu. The channel serves as a free-to-air syndicator for television programmes of Now TV. Its sister station is the English-language channel ViuTVsix.

Its parent, Viu, is the second largest streaming service in Southeast Asia by paid subscribers, ranking between Disney+ and Netflix. The boy band Mirror became prominent following the ViuTV's talent show Goodnight Show - King Maker.

History

In 2020, ViuTV had a reach of four million audiences.

Artists
All of the artists below was managed by their subsidiary MakerVille, which also been evolved into the TV & Movies production. (See below)

Groups
With the exception of P1X3L, which is under the label of Universal Music, all of its groups are under the label of Music Nation Records, a music company owned by Richard Li.
 COLLAR
 ERROR
 MIRROR
 P1X3L

Individuals (Male)
 Thor Lok
 Johnny Hui
 Brian Chan
 Colin Chan
 Dixon Wong
 Janzen Tsang
 Vincent Tang

Individuals (Female)
 Hailey Chan
 Shirley Sham
 Bonde Shum
 Katherine Chan
 Sarika Choi
 Mishy Fish
 Florica Lin
 Alina Li
 Kathy Wong
 Wayii Cheng
 Gloria Cheung
 Pony Tsoi
 Ranya Lee
 Ah Gi
 Melody
 Yoyo Kot
 Alice Hui
 Sica Ho
 Win Win Yeung
 Ash Chung

Notable shows from ViuTV
Survival Show:
:
 Goodnight Show - King Maker (2018)
 King Maker II (2019)
 King Maker III (2020)
 King Maker IV (2021)
Music Show 
 Chill Club (2019-)
Music Award 
 Chill Club Awards (2021-)
Drama
 We Are The Littles (2019)
 Leap Day (2020)
 Ossan's Love HK (2021)
 In Geek We Trust (2022)
 We Got Game (2022)
Variety Show
 Mirror Go (2018)
 ERROR Crazy Trip (2019)
 be On Game (2020)
 ERROR Selfish Project (2021)
 Battle Feel (2021)
 Be a Better MIRROR (2021)
 be On Game Season 2 (2021)
Talk Show
 Talker - Helmet Intercom (2016-)

References

External links
 
Official Youtube Channel

 
 Television channels and stations established in 2016
Chinese-language television stations
2016 establishments in Hong Kong
Television stations in Hong Kong